Megan Compston (born 21 November 1980) is a former Australian cricketer. A right-arm medium bowler, she played two List A matches for Victoria during the 2007–08 season of the Women's National Cricket League (WNCL).

Compston also played 211 matches for Essendon Maribyrnong Park Ladies Cricket Club (EMPLCC).

References

External links
 
 

1980 births
Place of birth missing (living people)
Living people
Australian cricketers
Australian women cricketers
Victoria women cricketers